Interstitial cell refers to any cell that lies in the spaces between the functional cells of a tissue.

Examples include:
 Interstitial cell of Cajal (ICC)
 Leydig cells, cells present in the male testes responsible for the production of androgen (male sex hormone)
 A portion of the stroma of ovary
 Certain cells in the pineal gland
 Renal interstitial cells
 neuroglial cells

See also 
List of human cell types derived from the germ layers

References 
Sybil B Parker (ed). "Interstitial cell". McGraw Hill Dictionary of Scientific and Technical Terms. Fifth Edition. International Edition. 1994. Page 1041.

Cell biology
Biology-related lists